The Portugal women's national rugby sevens team finished at 10th place at the IRB Women's Sevens Challenge Cup held in London, losing to China in the Bowl final.

The team qualified to the 2016 Final Olympic Qualification Tournament.

Squad
Squad to IRB Women's Sevens Challenge Cup - 2012 London Sevens: 
 Joana Borlido
 Raquel Freitas
 Marta Moreira
 Carlota Gouveia
 Daniela Correia
 Joana Amorim
 Marta Ferreira
 Isabel Ozorio
 Leonor Amaral
 Joana Vieira
 Catarina Antunes
 Cátia João

2012 IRB Challenge: London Sevens
Group B

  14 - 15 
  19 - 10 
  54 - 0 
  0 - 19 
  29-0 
  5 - 24 
Bowl Semi Finals (9th-12th)
  10 - 26 
  14 - 33  
Bowl final:9th/10th Match 
  5 - 43

References

Women's national rugby sevens teams
Seven
R